United Telefilm Records was a Canadian owned record label, a division of United Telefilms Limited, based in New York. It was the founded in 1959.

It was the mother label of Warwick Records.

See also
 List of record labels

References

Defunct record labels of the United States
Record labels established in 1959
Record labels disestablished in 1961